Indravati Dam is a gravity dam on the Indravati River a tributary of Godavari, about 90 km from Bhawanipatna in the state of Odisha in India. It is connected to the main Indravati reservoir via 4.32 km long and 7 m dia head race tunnel designed for a discharge capacity of 210 cumecs and terminating in a surge shaft. Currently it is the largest power producing dam in eastern India with a capacity of 600 MW.

Characteristics 

History 
Prior 1947 Late HH Maharaja PK Deo had already envisioned the project, and played a pivitol role afterwards. The main purpose of the dam was Hydroelectricity and irrigation. The project was operating and maintaining by Govt. of Odisha and Water Resources Department. The dam was completed by Govt. of Odisha in 1996.

Hydroelectric Project 

The Upper Indravati Project envisages diversion of water of the Indravati river in its upper reaches into the Mahanadi river basin for power generation and irrigation. In addition to the power house, the project involved construction of 4 dams across the Indravati and its tributaries, 8 dykes and two inter-linking channels to form a single reservoir with a live capacity of 1,435.5 Million m3 and a barrage across Hati river in Mahanadi river basin.

References

External links 

 Indravati Power Station from Internet Archive

Dams in Odisha
Dams completed in 2001
Energy infrastructure completed in 2001
Hydroelectric power stations in Odisha
Gravity dams
2001 establishments in Orissa